John Louis Moll (December 21, 1921 – July 19, 2011) was an American electrical engineer, notable for his  contributions to solid-state physics.

Biography
Moll was born in Wauseon, Ohio, and obtained a B.Sc. in Physics and a Ph.D. in Electrical Engineering from Ohio State University in 1943 and 1952 respectively.  The Ebers-Moll transistor model, and the theory of the p-n-p-n switch, came from this effort.

Moll was the recipient of the Guggenheim Fellowship in 1964; Howard N. Potts Medal, Franklin Institute, 1967, and  received the IEEE Edison Medal in 1991 "for pioneering contributions to diffused and oxide-masked silicon devices, transistor analysis, the p-n-p-n switch, and optoelectronics."

He was a Fellow of the IEEE and a member of the American Physical Society, the National Academy of Engineering, and the National Academy of Sciences.

Footnotes

References

 Dr. John Moll Wins C&C Prize. Hewlett-Packard. Accessed 2011-03-01.
 J.J. Ebers & J.L. Moll (1954) "Large signal behavior of junction transistors", Proceedings of the Institute of Radio Engineers 42(12):1761–72.
 Obituary. Accessed 2011-08-04.
 

1921 births
2011 deaths
Members of the United States National Academy of Sciences
American electrical engineers
Fellow Members of the IEEE
Members of the United States National Academy of Engineering
IEEE Edison Medal recipients
People from Wauseon, Ohio
Howard N. Potts Medal recipients
Ohio State University College of Engineering alumni